Arctotheca  is a small genus of flowering plants in the aster family. They are annuals or perennials native to southern Africa. It is becoming an invasive weed in other parts of the world.

Species
The following is a list of the accepted species and their native countries:
 Arctotheca calendula  — Cape Provinces, Free State, KwaZulu-Natal, Lesotho
 Arctotheca forbesiana  — Cape Provinces
 Arctotheca marginata  — Northern Cape
 Arctotheca populifolia  — Cape Provinces, KwaZulu-Natal, Mozambique
 Arctotheca prostrata  — Cape Provinces, Namibia

References

External links

Asteraceae genera
Flora of Southern Africa
Arctotideae